The 2010 Constellation Cup was the inaugural Constellation Cup series played between Australia and New Zealand. The series featured three netball test matches. Australia won the opening test 48–43. New Zealand leveled the series by winning the second test 59–40. Australia won the inaugural Constellation Cup series by defeating New Zealand 46–40 in the final test. The Australia team was coached by Norma Plummer and captained by Sharelle McMahon. New Zealand were coached by Ruth Aitken and captained by Casey Williams. Both teams used the series to prepare for the 2010 Commonwealth Games.

Squads

Australia

New Zealand

Matches

First test

Holden Netball Test Series

Second test

New World International Netball Series

Third test

Gallery

References

2010
2010 in New Zealand netball
2010 in Australian netball
August 2010 sports events in Australia
September 2010 sports events in New Zealand